Anticapitalist Left (Sinistra Anticapitalista, SA) is a small far-left political party in Italy, led by Franco Turigliatto.

History
Following the dissolution of Critical Left (SC) in 2013, Franco Turigliatto, Antonio Moscato, and other militants of the former SC, founded a new party, Anticapitalist Left. The new organization "promotes the elaboration and implementation of a revolutionary communist, feminist, environmentalist, and libertarian political program". In anticipation of the Italian election of 2018 and after having started a dialogue with the Workers' Communist Party, SA decided to join Power to the People. On 4 October, the Anticapitalist Left decided to abandon the project, deciding that working with former OPG and Eurostop members to give life to a new party would have distorted the original project of a common, open, pluralist and inclusive front. At its second national congress, held in February 2019, the Anticapitalist Left became the Italian section of the Fourth International.

References

External links
Official website

2013 establishments in Italy
Communist parties in Italy
Far-left politics in Italy
Fourth International (post-reunification)
Political parties established in 2013
Trotskyist organisations in Italy